David Terry may refer to:

David D. Terry (1881–1963), U.S. Representative from Arkansas
David S. Terry (1823–1889), California Father and Chief Justice of the California Supreme Court
David Terry (Oregon politician) in Oregon state elections, 2006

See also